Hertenstein may refer to:

 Hertenstein, Lucerne, a village part of the municipality of Weggis, Canton of Lucerne, Switzerland
 Hertensteiner Programm
 Hertenstein, Aargau, a village in the municipality of Obersiggenthal, Canton of Aargau, Switzerland
 Ruine Hertenstein, the ruin of a castle at Sigmaringen, Germany
 Hertenstein Castle, the ruin of a castle near Blaufelden, Germany

People with the surname
Wilhelm Hertenstein (1825-1888), member of the Swiss Federal Council (1879-1888)

See also
Hartenstein (disambiguation)